The 2009–10 season of the Liga I Feminin was the 20th season of Romania's premier women's football league. ASA Târgu Mureş won the championship.

Standings

References

Rom
Fem
Romanian Superliga (women's football) seasons